The following buildings were added to the National Register of Historic Places as part of the Archeological Properties of the Naval Live Oaks Reservation Multiple Property Submission (or MPS).

References

Gulf Islands National Seashore
 Santa Rosa
National Register of Historic Places Multiple Property Submissions in Florida